James E. O'Neill Jr. was a Democratic Michigan politician and teacher who served as a member of that state's House of Representatives from 1967 through 1994. A high school teacher and elementary school principal in Hemlock, O'Neill was a tireless advocate for schools and education, a respected source of information on school finance, and a key contributor to the landmark changes made by Proposal A. O'Neill was also a strong supporter of Saginaw Valley State University, and the arena in the Ryder Center on the campus was named in his honor in 1989. Following his retirement from the Legislature, O'Neill was appointed to the Board of State Canvassers. He died of complications from open-heart surgery on December 31, 2002, aged 73.

References

1929 births
2002 deaths
Democratic Party members of the Michigan House of Representatives
Politicians from Saginaw, Michigan
American school administrators
Central Michigan University alumni
University of Michigan alumni
20th-century American politicians
20th-century American educators
Schoolteachers from Michigan